Ringing Down the Years is the fourteenth studio album by English band Strawbs. The album was released initially only in Canada. Because of the record company's request that a Canadian song be included on the album (in order to facilitate Canadian airplay),  the track "Might as Well Be on Mars" written by members of the Pukka Orchestra was included.

The title track was written by leader Dave Cousins about his hearing of the death of former member Sandy Denny.

Track listing

"Might as Well Be on Mars" (Graeme Williamson, Neil Chapman) – 4:11
"The King" (Dave Cousins) – 3:01
"Forever Ocean Blue" (Cousins) – 3:58
"Grace Darling" (Cousins) – 6:32
"Afraid to Let You Go" (Rod Demick, Richard Hudson, Brian Willoughby) – 3:55
"Tell Me What You See in Me" (Cousins) – 6:27
"Ringing Down the Years" (Cousins) – 6:57
"Stone Cold is the Woman's Heart" (Cousins) – 4:21
"Taking a Chance" (Demick, Hudson, Willoughby) – 3:57

Personnel

Dave Cousins – lead vocals, backing vocals, acoustic guitar
Tony Hooper – backing vocals, acoustic guitar
Richard Hudson – lead vocals (track 9), backing vocals, drums, acoustic guitar
Brian Willoughby – electric guitar
Chris Parren – keyboards
Rod Demick – lead vocals (track 5), backing vocals, bass guitar
Cathy Lesurf - vocals on "The King"

Recording

Recorded at Parkwood Studios, Chalfont St. Giles, England, spring 1990

Stuart Kerrison, Strawbs – producers
Stuart Kerrison – engineer

Release history

References
Ringing Down the Years on Strawbsweb
Sleeve notes on CD RGF/WC DCD039 Don't Say Goodbye/Ringing Down the Years 2-CD set

Strawbs albums
1991 albums